Mbuma is a small village in rural Zimbabwe, situated in Nkayi District (Matabeleland North).

See also Mbuma Mission Hospital.

Nkayi District, Zimbabwe
Populated places in Matabeleland North Province